Challachintalapudi is a village in Eluru district of the Indian state of Andhra Pradesh. It is administered under of Eluru revenue division.

Demographics 

 Census of India, Challachintalapudi has population of 4539 of which 2268 are males while 2271 are females.  Average Sex Ratio is 1001. Population of children with age 0-6 is 422 which makes up 9.30% of total population of village, Child sex ratio is 1110. Literacy rate of the village was 70.97%.

References

Villages in Eluru district